There are approximately 900 Māori Wardens in New Zealand who are volunteers providing support, security, traffic and crowd control and first aid, under the Māori Community Development Act 1962. Their main powers under the Act relate to alcohol, with the ability to warn a licensee to stop serving liquor to a Māori, order any Māori to leave a hotel, seize liquor at a Māori function, or take car keys.

Government accepted rūnanga in 1861 to provide for local Māori self-government. Māori Wardens ('Kaitiaki') were then appointed on their recommendation. However, after the Invasion of the Waikato, government involvement declined, so it was not until the Māori Social and Economic Advancement Act 1945 that Tribal Executives got power to nominate and control Māori wardens in their current form. The formation of the Maori Warden system after 1945 was in response to government and community concerns that Maori could not handle alcohol responsibly. The Māori Social and Economic Advancement Act 1945 gave Maori Wardens "powers of preventing drunkenness and of otherwise controlling the consumption of alcoholic liquor among Maoris". Section 7 of the 1962 Act gave responsibility for Māori Wardens to District Māori Councils.

Each rohe (Tāmaki Makaurau & Te Tai Tokerau; Waikato Tainui; Wellington, Kāpiti, Horowhenua & Manawatū; Whanganui, Taranaki, Rangitikei & Ruapehu; Te Tairāwhiti, Heretaunga & Wairarapa and Te Waipounamu) has a regional co-ordinator who builds relationships with local agencies and groups to promote Māori Wardens' services.

In 2013 Te Puni Kōkiri held consultations regarding the future of Māori Wardens, setting out options for the organisation's future administration and role. In July 2019 representatives at a national conference of Māori Wardens discussed ways to modernise the organisation and a working group was set up to consult with the government. Discussion continued at the 2021 conference.

In 2021 during the COVID-19 pandemic, Māori Wardens  worked with health authorities to encourage local people to get vaccinated and supported efforts in welfare and border control.

Criticism that Māori Wardens are a form of racial discrimination dates back as far as the 1960s. In 1997 the then chairman of the Māori Council Sir Graham Latimer stated that he supported the 1962 Act, saying: "Even though it is discriminatory, it is needed for our people".  He considered that Māori wardens had better relations with Māori people than police did. In 2011 New Zealand Police were considering asking Māori Wardens to help patrol busy areas during the Rugby World Cup. The then prime minister John Key said the law was "antiquated and outdated" and seemed racist. He stated "At the end of the day if someone's removed from a bar it should be because they're underage or they're intoxicated. Ethnicity's got nothing do with it."  Māori Wardens responded by stating that they used Māori values to support and protect people of all ethnicities. In 2016 lawyer Graeme Edgeler described the Māori Community Development Act 1962 as New Zealand's "most racist law" and several politicians backed his call to repeal the legislation.

Māori Wardens also operate in Australia, in Victoria, Queensland, New South Wales and Western Australia.

References

Further reading 
Fleras, A. (1981). Maori Wardens and the control of liquor among the Maori of New Zealand. The Journal of the Polynesian Society, 90(4), 495–513. 

Waitangi Tribunal (2014). Aroha ki te Tangata / Service to the People. In Whaia te Mana Motuhake In Pursuit of Mana Motuhake. 253–299. 
Law enforcement in New Zealand
Māori organisations